Prudhoe Youth Club Football Club is a football club based in Prudhoe, England. They are currently members of the Northern League Division Two and play at Kimberley Park, groundsharing with Newcastle University.

History
Prudhoe Youth Club were formed in 1969. In 2015, Prudhoe Youth Club joined the Northern Alliance Division Two, gaining promotion into Division One in 2018.  The following year, Prudhoe Youth Club merged with Prudhoe Town. In 2022, the club was admitted into the Northern League Division Two.

Ground
The club currently play at Kimberley Park, Prudhoe, groundsharing with Newcastle University.

References

Prudhoe
Association football clubs established in 1969
1969 establishments in England
Football clubs in England
Football clubs in Northumberland
Northern Football Alliance
Northern Football League